The Oxfordshire Gold Cup was a greyhound racing competition held at Oxford Stadium until the stadium closed in 2012. The competition was inaugurated in 1985 and introduced by Mick Wheble. It was won three times in succession by Jolly Poacher.

Past winners

Discontinued

Distances
1985-2012 (450 metres)

Sponsors
1986-1986 Hall's Brewery Skol
1987-1987 E.J Watts & Sons
1988-1988 Lynton Racing
1990-1995 Stadium Bookmakers
1996-1998 Carlsberg
1999-2000 RD Racing
2001-2001 William Hill
2002-2006 RD Racing
2007-2007 Stadium Bookmakers
2009-2011 Blanchford Building Supplies
2012-2012 Claydon Racing

References 

Greyhound racing competitions in the United Kingdom
Sport in Oxfordshire
Recurring sporting events established in 1985
1985 establishments in England